The internal circulation reactor (IC reactor) is a form of anaerobic digester. It is primarily designed to treat wastewater. The IC reactor is an evolution of the UASB and EGSB digestion systems. The digester typically produces biogas with a high concentration methane (c80%). In essence the IC to improve digestion rates and gas yields. The foot print for the IC reactor is therefore typically smaller. However, it is taller due to the increased complexity of the reactor.

The IC reactor typically comes as part of a two-stage anaerobic digestion system where it is preceded by an acidification and hydrolysis tank. Effluent leaving the IC reactor will often require aerobic treatment to reduce biochemical (BOD) and COD to discharge consent levels.

See also
Anaerobic digester types

Anaerobic digester types